Haplochrois ganota is a moth in the family Elachistidae. It was described by Edward Meyrick in 1911. It is found in South Africa.

References

Natural History Museum Lepidoptera generic names catalog

Endemic moths of South Africa
Moths described in 1911
Elachistidae
Moths of Africa